Giacomo Ratto (born 19 April 1986 in Varese, Italy) is an Italian footballer who currently plays for Nilandhoo SC of the Central League Zone in the Maldives. He has played for clubs in many countries, including Panama, Nicaragua, Fiji, Switzerland, Mongolia, Greece, Malta, Iceland and Maldives.

Career

Early career: 2005-12
Ratto began playing football at the age of 8 with the US Bosto youth system, before moving to Varese Calcio at the age of 14. He then continued his career in the youth team of a club that, at the time, played in Serie C, but failed to debut in the first team. He moved to Luino Calcio in 2005, where he made his senior debut in Promozione, helping the team to a second-place finish in the league and winning the play-offs. He won his first league in the following season at FC Tradate. In all the following 3 seasons he changes team, playing in Eccellenza and Promozione. In 2010 Ratto had his first experience abroad, in Switzerland at AS Castello and, later, at FC Mendrisio Stabio. In 2012 he returned to Luino Calcio, team in which he had his senior debut.

Malta-Panama: 2013
Sending highlights packages and his resume to retired Maltese goalkeeper Mario Muscat, he arranged his move to S.K. Victoria Wanderers which happened in early 2013. Arriving at the end of the first round, Ratto made his debut in a 3-0 second round victory over Sannat Lions and conceding three goals in his first five fieldings. He finished the season with 5 clean sheets in 11 games helping to bring the team from seventh to third place. He left Gozo at the end of the contract and joined the preseason at Tauro FC  team of the Panamanian top league, during which he played some friendly games before moving back to Italy due to personal problems.

Nicaragua: 2014

Completing a transfer to UNAN Managua of Nicaragua in July 2014 through agent Carlos Francisco Fariñas on the recommendations of Giampaolo Gronchi of Tauro and Brian Azzopardi of Victoria Wanderers, Ratto recorded his maiden appearance when Los Universitarios were beaten by C.D. Walter Ferretti, a match in which he was chosen as one of the three players in the running for the man of the match award. After his last appearance against Real Madriz, he received an offer from Khoromkhon of the Mongolian Premier League to play the AFC Cup, which caused him to split ways with UNAN, also rejecting an offer from Costa Rica. However, they were withdrawn from the AFC Cup 2015, the second-tier Asian competition, so the deal fell through.

Fiji and Switzerland: 2015

Failing to land a deal in Albania, Ratto exchanged information with Suva coach Gurjit Singh, sealing an agreement with them in spring 2015 with Spaniard Adrián Garrido Medina, but was unable to take part in the OFC Champions League in view of the fact that there were registration issues. In July of the same year he returned to Switzerland to AC Taverne, a club in 2. Liga Interregional, signing a 5-month contract. In October, after an injury, he terminated his contract due to non-payment of his salary.

Zimbabwe and Mongolia: 2016

Fielded at the preseason four-side Bulawayo Football Festival by Tsholotsho of the Zimbabwe Premier Soccer League in 2016, he played the tournament with the Zhwane Boys. Working toward a contract in South Africa, he got in touch with Cape Town-based football instructor Hendrik Pieter de Jongh who got him a six-month deal in Mongolia with Ulaanbaatar City in 2016, causing him to be the first Italian footballer in the country. Arriving in April in the Mongolian capital with the aim of winning the championship, Ratto played a good season helping the team, which in the league had some difficulties and finished in eighth place, to reach the third place in the Mongolian Cup. During the summer break he receives the opportunity to take part in the CONCACAF Champions League with Don Bosco in Haiti which fell through.

Greece: 2017

Reported to contend for Philippos Alexandreia of the Greek Gamma Ethniki in 2017, he was fielded for the first time against Kilkisiakos which ended 0-0. Unfortunately, registration problems coupled with transfer deadline issues forced him to give up on the deal so he trained alone for several months.

Malta: 2018

Ratto returned to S.K. Victoria Wanderers in the middle of the 2017-18 season, with the team at the last place in the standings. During the remaining 14 games Ratto achieve 4 clean sheets, helping the team to avoid relegation, obtained with the victory of play-outs against Sannat Lions.

Iceland and Malta: 2019
At the end of March Ratto joins Vestri for a week trial in Spain. After having impressed the coach, he accepted the one-year contract offered by the club. During the season he played two cup games but left the club in July. After training alone for three months, he signed a contract with Fgura United, a Maltese First Division team, in which, however, he did not play official matches due to restrictions on the use of foreign players. With the Maltese team he played two friendly games against Floriana FC and Marsaxlokk FC making a good impression before terminate the contract to return to S.K. Victoria Wanderers.

Malta: 2020
On 3 January 2020 he signed for S.K. Victoria Wanderers for the third time in his career. Before the stop of the league due by Covid-19 pandemic, decided on 25 March 2020, Ratto played 8 games achieving 3 clean sheets; with the final stop of the league, arrived on 13 May 2020, the team stayed in the Gozo Football League First Division closing the season at 7th place.

Malta: 2020-2021
On 13 July 2020 he extended his contract with S.K. Victoria Wanderers until 8 June 2021. During this season Ratto played 9 times in Gozo Football League First Division, competition in which the team closed again in 7th position. In this season Ratto made his debut in the Maltese FA Trophy, playing on 27 December 2020 the preliminary round against Marsaxlokk F.C. At the end of the season due to the new restrictive measures for the containment of Covid-19 in the Maltese archipelago, Ratto made 12 appearances (9 in the Gozo Football League First Division, 1 in Maltese FA Trophy and 2 in G.F.A. Cup).

Malta: 2021-2022
On 9 June 2021 he extended his contract with S.K. Victoria Wanderers until 8 June 2022. After 5 total seasons, during which he made 49 league appearances, 1 FA Cup and 2 GFA Cup, Ratto’s career in Gozo ended on 10 November by mutual agreement with the club.

Maldives: 2022-2023
On September 23, Ratto signed with Club Eydhafushi, through a negotiation conducted by Egyptian agent Ahmed Rashwan at the specific request of coach Mohamed Athif. His first experience in the Maldives ended on 6 October with the victory of Central League Zone Group A. On October 18, thanks to positive performances at Club Eydhafushi, he was purchased by Nilandhoo SC to play in Group D of the Central League Zone. Also this time Ratto ended with the title, won by Nilandhoo on 20 November.

Personal life

He supports Deportivo de La Coruña in Spain  as well as Torino in his home country.

Honours

Club
Luino Calcio
Promozione play-offs: 2005-06
FC Tradate
Promozione: 2006-07
S.K. Victoria Wanderers
Gozo Football League First Division: 3rd Place, 2012-13
Ulaanbaatar City FC
Mongolia Cup: 3rd Place, 2016
Vestri
2. deild karla: 2nd Place, 2019
Club Eydhafushi
Central League Zone Group A: Champions, 2022/23
Nilandhoo SC
Central League Zone Group D: Champions, 2022/23

Individual
MVP Walter Ferretti-UNAN Managua, 3rd August 2014
Corriere dello Sport: Top 100 Italian Players Abroad, 2016

AMA Livestream Gozo: Save of the Season, 2020/2021

References

External links 
 at Soccerway

Living people
1986 births
Italian expatriate footballers
Expatriate footballers in Fiji
Expatriate footballers in Greece
Tauro F.C. players
Expatriate footballers in Nicaragua
Italian expatriate sportspeople in Nicaragua
Expatriate footballers in Switzerland
Association football goalkeepers
Italian footballers
Expatriate footballers in Malta
Suva F.C. players
Gozo Football League First Division players
Expatriate footballers in Panama
Expatriate footballers in Mongolia
S.S.D. Varese Calcio players